"Hail Varsity" is the fight song of the University of Nebraska–Lincoln (NU), written in 1936 by Joyce Ayres and composed the same year by Wilbur Chenoweth. The song is often played at Memorial Stadium during Nebraska's football games by the University of Nebraska Cornhusker Marching Band and at other athletic events by the school's pep band.

History

Prior to 1936, the University of Nebraska had a series of unofficial fights songs, most notably Dear Old Nebraska U. Fans lamented the lack of a song to "express Cornhuker determination" compared to similar schools with long-established fight songs. "Hail Varsity" was written and composed by Joyce Ayres and Wilbur Chenoweth in an effort to fill this role. It was first performed on November 21, 1936 at NU's annual Kosmet Klub Fall Revue, a student skit contest, by the school's Men's Glee Club. The performance was met with praise, and the Lincoln Journal Star called "Hail Varsity" "the new Nebraska song." When it became clear "Hail Varsity" was likely to be adopted in an official capacity, the school's newspaper, The Daily Nebraskan, urged students to learn the song's words and recite them at football games.

Initially, "Hail Varsity" was often performed and sang in its entirety by the Men's Glee Club. Eventually, the Cornhusker Marching Band replaced the Glee Club as the primary performers of the song, and as it is typically performed in short bursts at sporting events, most of today's fans are unaware of the lyrics outside of the chorus.

The University of Nebraska recognizes four other unofficial fight songs, "Dear Old Nebraska U", "March of the Cornhuskers", "The Cornhuskers (Come a Runnin' Boys)", and "Mr. Touchdown U.S.A." A fifth, "Band Song", is typically played as a lead-in to "Hail Varsity".

References

External links
Performance of Hail Varsity by the Cornhusker Marching Band

University of Nebraska–Lincoln
American college songs
College fight songs in the United States
Big Ten Conference fight songs
1936 songs